"Golden Sky" (EP) is the second single taken from the debut album of Australian band The Holidays. In Australia, it was released digitally in May 2010 with tracks "Golden Sky", "Moonlight Hours" and a "Moonlight Hours" remix by Australian band The Swiss. In the UK, it was released in August 2010 as a 7" via the Passport Label with A-side "Golden Sky" and B-side "Heavy Feathers". Recorded at home and self-produced, with additional recording and production at BJB Studios, "Golden Sky" was added to rotation on national youth radio station Triple J in May 2010. The track was mixed in Melbourne by Tony Espie and mastered by David Walker at Stepford Audio Melbourne.
The Holidays toured the east coast of Australia in support of the single, in late May/early June 2010.

A music video was also made for "Golden Sky" by Moop Jaw in May 2010.

Track listing 
Australian Version

British Version
"Golden Sky"
"Heavy Feathers"

External links 
 Official Website
 Liberation Music

References 

2010 EPs
The Holidays albums